The following is a list of footballers who have scored at least 100 domestic league goals in English league football. This includes the appearances and goals of former players in the Premier League and The Football League.

Players who came up just short of the 200 mark include Clive Allen, Chris Chilton, Peter Doherty, Gary Lineker, Jack Smith, Freddie Steele and Andrew Wilson.
 
Due to the close connections between English and Scottish football, several players have played for clubs in England and in the Scottish Football League and its successors and amassed over 200 goals across the two systems, including David McLean (over 160 goals in both), Joe Baker (over 140 in both), Neil Martin (over 110 in both) and Kenny Dalglish (over 110 in both).

Horace Barnes, Tony Brown and Bobby Charlton are the only midfielders to have scored over 200 goals in English football.

List of players 

Players still active in the English leagues are listed in Bold
Players still active but not in the English leagues are listed in Italics
† English Football Hall of Fame Inductee.
‡ Scottish Football Hall of Fame Inductee.

See also
List of English football first tier top scorers
List of footballers in England by number of league appearances
List of footballers in Scotland by number of league appearances
List of footballers in Scotland by number of league goals

References

England league goals
Football
Football records and statistics in England
Footballers